Catnip Dynamite is the second solo album by Jellyfish co-founder Roger Joseph Manning, Jr., released in Japan on March 19, 2008. Catnip Dynamite was released outside Japan by Oglio Records on February 3, 2009.

The music on this album contains some of Manning's song ideas that go back as far as 1985.  Manning has described the album as "another roller coaster ride of sonic and emotional ups and downs and distraction in the greatest sense of the word."

Track listing

CD: PCCY-01871
All songs written by Roger Joseph Manning, Jr., except where noted.
"The Quickening" – 5:06
"Love's Never Half As Good" – 5:36
"Down in Front" – 5:23
"My Girl" – 4:09
"Imaginary Friend" – 5:07
"Haunted Henry" – 4:49
"Tinsel Town" – 5:23
"Turnstile at Heaven's Gate" – 4:40
"Survival Machine" – 7:54
"Living in End Times" – 5:09
"Drive Thru Girl" – 5:15
"American Affluenza" – 3:29

CD: Oglio Release
"The Quickening" – 5:06
"Love's Never Half As Good" – 5:36
"Down in Front" – 5:23
"My Girl" – 4:09
"Imaginary Friend" – 5:07
"Haunted Henry" – 4:49
"Tinsel Town" – 5:23
"Turnstile at Heaven's Gate" – 4:40
"Survival Machine" – 7:54
"Living in End Times" – 5:09
"Drive Thru Girl" – 5:15
"Europa and the Pirate Twins" (Thomas Dolby) – 3:37 *
"You Were Right" – 6:08 *
"Love Lies Bleeding" (Elton John/Bernie Taupin) – 11:34 *

* Live from Fuji Rock, Japan

Personnel
Musicians
Roger Joseph Manning Jr. – music and lyrics
Pedal steel guitar on "Tinsel Town" by Dave Pearlman

Production
Produced by Roger Joseph Manning, Jr.
Mixed and mastered by John Paterno

References

External links

2008 albums
Roger Joseph Manning Jr. albums
Oglio Records albums
Pony Canyon albums